The Dead Girl is a 2006 American drama thriller film written and directed by Karen Moncrieff, starring Brittany Murphy, Toni Collette, Rose Byrne and Marcia Gay Harden. The film was nominated for several 2007 Independent Spirit Awards including Best Feature and Best Director. It is the story of a young woman's death and the people linked to her murder. It also features Mary Beth Hurt, Kerry Washington, James Franco, Giovanni Ribisi, Josh Brolin, Mary Steenburgen and Piper Laurie. The film was premiered at the AFI Film Festival (7 November 2006), and was given a limited US theatrical release on 29 December 2006. It was generally well received. It only ran for two weeks in US first-run theaters, and earned nearly all its revenue from overseas release.

Plot
The story is presented in five parts, each bearing a title:
 The Stranger: Arden (Colette) lives with her abusive, invalid mother (Laurie). One day she discovers the naked body of a dead woman on the property. Arden becomes a minor celebrity, drawing the attention of Rudy (Ribisi), who tells her the dead woman is the victim of a serial killer preying on young women in the area. Rudy asks Arden out. Arden gets into a fight with her mother, which compels her to finally leave home. Arden has her date with Rudy. In the morning, Arden calls the police to report a woman (her mother) left alone at home.
 The Sister: Leah (Byrne) is prepping the dead woman in the morgue when she notices a certain birthmark. Leah suspects that the dead woman is her sister, Jenny, who was taken from a nearby park fifteen years ago. She asks the sheriff to match the dental records. She is certain the dead woman is her missing sister, but Leah's parents (Steenburgen, Bruce Davison) refuse to believe that Jenny is dead. The sheriff delivers the test result: the dead woman is not Jenny. Therefore, the episode title was a red herring.
 The Wife: Ruth (Hurt) is angry that her husband, Carl (Nick Searcy), leaves her alone night after night. The next morning, she discovers clothing, wallets, and ID's in ziplock bags inside a storage unit that is supposedly empty. She matches the IDs to names in the newspapers of a serial killer's victims. Carl comes back late at night with scratches on his neck. After another argument, he leaves the house to go to the car outside. He pulls a trash bag out of the trunk and goes to the storage unit. Ruth asks Carl if he knows anything about the missing women, and he says no. Later that night, Ruth enters the unit and pulls everything out. She drives to the police station, but doesn't follow through with her plan to present the evidence she found to the authorities; instead Ruth returns home to burn the evidence.
 The Mother: The dead woman has been identified as Krista Kutcher. Melora (Harden), Krista's mother, is notified. Melora goes to Krista's previous house and finds Rosetta (Washington), Krista's former roommate. During a tense conversation with Rosetta, Melora learns that her daughter had been a prostitute, that she gave birth to a daughter, and that Melora's late husband had sexually abused her. The following day, Melora takes Krista's daughter home with her.
 The Dead Girl: Krista (Murphy) buys her daughter a stuffed animal for her third birthday. One of her johns, Tarlow (Brolin), promises to drive her to Norwalk, where her daughter is, but he backs out at the last minute. Krista goes back to her room and finds Rosetta — implied to be her lover — severely beaten. Krista believes the culprit to be a man named Tommy (Dennis Keiffer). Krista vandalizes Tommy's car and, when he tries to stop her, she beats him up and leaves on a borrowed motorcycle. Krista calls Rosetta, and tearfully asks if Rosetta cares about her; Rosetta doesn't reply, and Krista hangs up, saddened and hurt. When the motorcycle breaks down on the highway, Krista hitches a ride from Carl. The film ends with Krista smiling, and happily talking about her daughter.

Cast
 Toni Collette as Arden Taylor
 Brittany Murphy as Krista Kutcher
 Rose Byrne as Leah Taylor
 Marcia Gay Harden as Melora Kutcher
 Mary Beth Hurt as Ruth
 Kerry Washington as Rosetta
 Giovanni Ribisi as Rudy
 Josh Brolin as Tarlow
 Piper Laurie as Arden's mother
 Nick Searcy as Carl
 Mary Steenburgen as Beverley, Leah's mother
 Bruce Davison as Leah's father
 James Franco as Derek

Reception
, The Dead Girl holds a 76% approval rating on the review aggregation website Rotten Tomatoes, based on 82 critics, with an average score of 6.69/10. The site's critical consensus states: "This dark thriller boasts a fresh approach, but it can still get bogged down by its heavy subject matter."

References

External links
 
 
 
 Soundtrack

2006 films
2006 crime drama films
American crime drama films
American independent films
American mystery films
Films about missing people
Films directed by Karen Moncrieff
Films produced by Gary Lucchesi
Films produced by Tom Rosenberg
Films about grieving
Lakeshore Entertainment films
2006 independent films
2000s English-language films
2000s American films
Crimes against sex workers in fiction